C. falcata  may refer to:
 Coilostylis falcata, an orchid species
 Cordania falcata, a trilobite species
 Crassula falcata, a plant species

Synonyms
 Cassia falcata (disambiguation), a disambiguation page